FIBA Americas League Awards are the annual individual awards of the top-tier level men's professional club basketball league in Latin America, the FIBA Americas League (Portuguese: FIBA Liga das Américas, Spanish: FIBA Liga de las Américas).

FIBA Americas League Grand Final MVP
The Grand Finals MVP is the award given to the best player of the Grand Final of the FIBA Americas League Final 4, which is the culminating final four tournament of each season's FIBA Americas League.

FIBA Americas League Top Scorer
The Top Scorer award is the award for the league leader in points per game of each season of FIBA Americas League.

Quinteto Ideal (Ideal Quintet)
The Quinteto Ideal (English: Ideal Quintet) is the award for the league's best 5 players of each season.

See also
FIBA Americas League
FIBA Americas League Final 4

References

External links
FIBA Americas League 
FIBA Americas League 
FIBA Americas  
FIBA Liga Americas Twitter 
LatinBasket.com FIBA Americas League 
Liga de las Américas YouTube Channel 

Basketball trophies and awards
Awards